The bulbous dreamer, Oneirodes eschrichtii, is a dreamer of the family Oneirodidae, found in all oceans, in deep water.  Its length is up to 2.8 cm (1 in) for males and up to 29 cm (11 in) for females.

See also
 Angler fish

References
 
 Tony Ayling & Geoffrey Cox, Collins Guide to the Sea Fishes of New Zealand,  (William Collins Publishers Ltd, Auckland, New Zealand 1982) 

Oneirodidae
Deep sea fish
Fish described in 1871